In enzymology, a vomilenine reductase is an enzyme that catalyzes the chemical reaction

1,2-dihydrovomilenine + NADP+  vomilenine + NADPH + H+

Thus, the two substrates of this enzyme are 1,2-dihydrovomilenine and NADP+, whereas its 3 products are vomilenine, NADPH, and H+.

This enzyme belongs to the family of oxidoreductases, specifically those acting on the CH-NH group of donors with NAD+ or NADP+ as acceptor.  The systematic name of this enzyme class is 1,2-dihydrovomilenine:NADP+ oxidoreductase. This enzyme participates in indole and ipecac alkaloid biosynthesis.

References

 

EC 1.5.1
NADPH-dependent enzymes
Enzymes of unknown structure